Hosackia stipularis, synonym Lotus stipularis, is a species of legume endemic to California. It is known by the common name balsam bird's-foot trefoil. It is found in most of the northern and central coastal and inland mountain ranges and foothills. It can be found in many types of habitat, including forest, chaparral, and disturbed areas. This is a mostly erect perennial herb with a leafy, often hairy and glandular form. Its slender branches are lined with leaves each made of several leaflets up to 2 centimeters long. The leaves sometimes have prominent stipules. The inflorescence is a compact array of up to 9 pink flowers. Each flower is elongated, the corolla borne in a tubular calyx of sepals, and the entire unit may exceed a centimeter long. The fruit is a legume pod 2 or 3 centimeters long containing several beanlike seeds.

References

External links
Jepson Manual Treatment
USDA Plants Profile
Photo gallery

stipularis
Endemic flora of California
Flora without expected TNC conservation status